Disney's Aladdin in Nasira's Revenge is a platform game based on the Aladdin franchise which was developed for the PlayStation and PC by Argonaut Games and distributed by Disney Interactive in 2000. In the game, Aladdin, Abu and Jasmine fight against Jafar's sister Nasira who wants to bring him back to life. Nasira's Revenge received generally average reviews.

Gameplay
The player assumes control of three characters in the game: Aladdin, Abu, and Jasmine. Aladdin's abilities range from sword fighting to jumping to stomping. Abu can jump, roll, and climb on walls to a certain degree. Jasmine's character is hiding in a pot for her level therefore the player can hide and hop.

The player collects gold coins throughout each level and fights a variety of villains. The game's environments vary and allow interaction. There are minigames at the end of each level: pie throwing, surfing, skateboarding, and cloud jumping.

Plot
Disney's Aladdin in Nasira's Revenge is set after the events of The Return of Jafar, during the television series and before Aladdin and the King of Thieves. As the game begins, Agrabah is in peril again, this time threatened by the evil sorceress Nasira (Jodi Benson).

The evil witch Nasira begins her plot by taking over the palace with a spell and kidnapping Jasmine (Linda Larkin) and the Sultan (Val Bettin). She then commands the guard's captain Razoul (Jim Cummings) to bring Aladdin (Scott Weinger) to her dead or alive. She also imprisons the Genie (Dan Castellaneta) in the Cave of Wonders, and removes his magical powers. Nasira believes that if she collects a set of ancient relics that are spread all over Agrabah she might be able to revive her brother Jafar (Jonathan Freeman) and take over the world, and so she uses her captives to force Aladdin into doing this job for her. The game ends with Nasira resurrecting Jafar in her volcanic lair, but Aladdin manages to smash the artifacts and destroy him once again while Nasira herself flees and apparently survives.

Reception

The PlayStation version received "mixed" reviews according to the review aggregation website Metacritic. David Chen of NextGen, however, called it "A nicely made game – on the easy side, but perfect for kids."

Notes

References

External links

2000 video games
3D platform games
Nasira's Revenge
PlayStation (console) games
Cancelled Nintendo 64 games
Single-player video games
Sony Interactive Entertainment games
Video games developed in the United Kingdom
Video games featuring female protagonists
Egyptian mythology in popular culture
Video games set in Egypt
Video games set in the Middle East
Windows games
Video games about witchcraft
Action-adventure games
Fantasy video games
Argonaut Games games